Sopravvissuti della città morta (Survivors of the Dead City) or Ark of the Sun God is a 1984 Italian action film starring David Warbeck and directed by Antonio Margheriti. The film was partly filmed and produced in Turkey.

Cast

David Warbeck ...  Rick Spear 
John Steiner ...  Lord Dean 
Susie Sudlow ...  Carol 
Luciano Pigozzi ...  Beetle (as Alan Collins) 
Ricardo Palacios ...  Mohammed 
Achille Brugnini ...  Rupert (as Anthony Berner) 
Aytekin Akkaya ...  Prince Abdullah 
Süleyman Turan

References

External links 
 
 The Ark of the Sun God at Variety Distribution

Cultural depictions of Gilgamesh
1980s Italian-language films
1984 films
Films directed by Antonio Margheriti
Italian adventure films
1980s adventure films
Treasure hunt films
Films shot in Turkey
1980s Italian films